Ma Alalta is a stratovolcano in the Afar Region of Ethiopia, located well to the west of the Danakil Depression at the foot of the regional Ethiopian scarp.

Ma Alalta is trachytic and rhyolitic in composition, containing nested oval-shaped calderas at its summit. Extending northeast and southeast of the stratovolcano are ignimbrite deposits that may be related to the formation of a larger caldera in which Ma Alalta is located.

The northwestern, southeastern and eastern flanks of Ma Alalta have produced youthful basaltic lava flows whereas the southern flank has produced recent pantelleritic obsidian domes and lava flows. One of the domes exhibit fumarolic activity.

References

Afar Region
Stratovolcanoes of Ethiopia
Volcanoes of the Great Rift Valley
Mountains of Ethiopia
Calderas of Ethiopia
Pleistocene stratovolcanoes